List of protected species in Taiwan.

According to Wildlife Conservation Act Republic of China (Taiwan) article 4, endangered and vulnerable species were classified into following categories: 
 I - Endangered species (瀕臨絕種保育類)
 II - Rare and valuable species (珍貴稀有保育類)
 III - Other conservation-deserving species (其他應予保育類)

Animals

Mammals

Birds

Reptiles

Amphibians

Fishes

Crustaceans

Insects

Plants

See also
 Endemic species of Taiwan

External links
 conservation.forest.gov.tw

Biota of Taiwan
Nature conservation in Taiwan